Terrie Huntington (October 24, 1949) is an American politician and member of the Republican Party who served as a member of the Kansas House of Representatives from 2003 to 2010 and as a member of the Kansas State Senate from 2010 to 2013.

Career
Prior to her election to the House, Huntington has served as a member of the Village Presbyterian Church, Shawnee Mission Education Foundation, National Development Council, and Northeast Johnson County Chamber of Commerce.

Huntington served in the Kansas House of Representatives, representing the 25th district, from 2003 until 2010, when she resigned to join the Senate.

In the Kansas Senate, Huntington represented the 7th district. She was appointed to serve the remainder of David Wysong's term, who had resigned.

After being targeted for defeat in the 2012 primary elections for her moderate positions, Huntington declined to run for election to a full term. She was succeeded by fellow Republican Kay Wolf.

Personal life
She is a graduate of the University of Kansas and has been married to her husband, Jim, for 33 years.  They have two children.

Committee assignments
Huntington served on these legislative committees in the Senate:
 Ways and Means
 Local Government
 Kansas Public Employees Retirement System Select
 Educational Planning
 Public Health and Welfare
 Transportation

Major donors
The top 5 donors to Huntington's 2008 campaign are individuals:
1. Totten, Bob $500 	
2. Kemp, Brad  $500 	
3. Desetti, Mark  $500 	
4. Bell, Luke  $500 	
5. Brownback, Sam  $500

References

External links
Official Campaign Website
Kansas Legislature - Terrie Huntington
Project Vote Smart profile
Kansas Votes profile
State Surge - Legislative and voting track record
Follow the Money campaign contributions:
2002, 2006, 2008

Republican Party members of the Kansas House of Representatives
Living people
Republican Party Kansas state senators
People from Johnson County, Kansas
Women state legislators in Kansas
1949 births
21st-century American women politicians
21st-century American politicians
University of Kansas alumni